Laurent Dos Santos (born 21 September 1993) is a French professional footballer. He plays as a midfielder for  club Villefranche.

Career
On 23 November 2013, Dos Santos made his professional debut with Guingamp in a 2013–14 Ligue 1 match against Montpellier.

Personal life
Born in France, Dos Santos is of Portuguese descent.

References

External links

1993 births
Living people
People from Montmorency, Val-d'Oise
Footballers from Val-d'Oise
French people of Portuguese descent
Association football midfielders
French footballers
Ligue 1 players
Ligue 2 players
En Avant Guingamp players
RC Strasbourg Alsace players
Valenciennes FC players
FC Villefranche Beaujolais players